Stenaspis is a genus of beetles in the family Cerambycidae, containing the following species:

 Stenaspis castaneipennis Dupont, 1838
 Stenaspis pilosella Bates, 1892
 Stenaspis plagiata Waterhouse, 1877
 Stenaspis solitaria (Say, 1824)
 Stenaspis superba Aurivillius, 1908
 Stenaspis validicornis Casey, 1912
 Stenaspis verticalis Audinet-Serville, 1834

References

Trachyderini
Cerambycidae genera